Marius Sebastian Leca (born 6 July 2000) is a Romanian professional footballer who plays as a defender for CS Afumați.

Honours
Viitorul Constanța
Romanian Cup: 2018–19
Romanian Supercup: 2019

References

External links
 
 Marius Leca at LPF.ro 

2000 births
Living people
People from Constanța County
Romanian footballers
Romania youth international footballers
Association football defenders
Liga I players
FC Viitorul Constanța players
Liga II players
FCV Farul Constanța players
FC Unirea Constanța players
FC Dunărea Călărași players
Liga III players
CS Afumați players